Charles F. Stockmeister (August 12, 1914 – January 16, 2003) was an American politician who served in the New York State Assembly from 1949 to 1950 and from 1961 to 1969.

He died on January 16, 2003, in Clarkson, New York at age 88.

References

1914 births
2003 deaths
Democratic Party members of the New York State Assembly
20th-century American politicians